Onyx is a banded variety of chalcedony (quartz).

Onyx may also refer to:

Locations
Onyx, California, a census-designated place located in Kern County, California
Onyx, Arkansas
Onyx Cave (disambiguation), a common name for caves in the United States
Onyx River, a meltwater stream in the Antarctic
The Onyx Club, a jazz club in Pasadena, California, part of The Hotel Carver
Onyx Club (New York City), a jazz club on 52nd Street, in Manhattan, New York City

Entertainment
 Onyx, a fictitious planet in the novel Halo: Ghosts of Onyx
 Onyx, a 2005 episode of the TV series Smallville
 Onyx (wrestler), pro wrestler Kyle McNeely

Characters
Onyx (comics), a fictional comic book character in the DC Universe, mainly associated with the Batman titles
Onyx Von Trollenberg, a character from the animated series Trollz

Medicine
Onyx (Interventional radiology), EVOH based liquid embolic agent
Onyx Pharmaceuticals, a drug manufacturer

Organizations
Onyx (architectural collective), an architectural collective that practiced in New York City from 1968 to 1972
Onyx Collective, a content brand owned by Disney Entertainment championing projects from individuals belonging to underrepresented groups
Onyx Creative, an US architecture and design firm
Veolia Environmental Services, formerly Onyx Environnement
Onyx Grand Prix, a short-lived Formula One team, 1989–1990
Onyx Sports Cars, a UK kit car manufacturer

Technology
SGI Onyx, a line of symmetric multiprocessing computers from Silicon Graphics
Synaptics Onyx, a concept cellphone designed to display Synaptics ClearPad technology
Onyx International Inc, a company producing the Onyx Boox ebook readers
Onyx (satellite), a code name often associated with newer variants of the Lacrosse satellite
Onyx (interception system), a Swiss intelligence gathering system
Onyx-015, an adenovirus being researched for cancer treatment
OnyX, a freeware system maintenance and optimization tool for Mac OS X
Onyx Systems, a company that made computer systems based on the Zilog Z8000 microprocessor and Bell Labs' Unix
BlackBerry Bold 9700 (codenamed "Onyx"), a smartphone from RIM

Vessels
USS Onyx (PYc-5), a United States Navy patrol vessel of the mid-20th century
HMS Onyx, the name of seven ships of the Royal Navy
MS Onyx, a passenger ferry formerly known as Fennia and Casino Express

Music
Onyx (hip hop group), a Queens-based hip-hop group
Onyx (Cornish band), a Cornish 1960s band
The Onyx Hotel Tour, 2004 tour by pop singer Britney Spears
Onyx (DJ), an Israeli DJ

Albums
Onyx (Pop Evil album)
Onyx (Ava Inferi album), 2011

Other uses
Onyx (game), a strategy board game invented by Larry Back
Onyx: Black Lesbian Newsletter, a 1980s Californian magazine
Onyx, a Monotype typeface

See also
Onix (disambiguation)
P-800 Oniks, a Russian/Soviet supersonic anti-ship cruise missile